Mario Plutarco Marín Torres (born June 28, 1954, in Nativitas Cuautempan, near Ixcaquixtla, Puebla) is a Mexican politician affiliated with the Institutional Revolutionary Party (PRI) who served as governor of the  state of Puebla.

Personal life and education
Marín was born to Crecencio Marín and Blandina Torres. He has ten siblings. He holds a bachelor's degree in law from the Universidad Autónoma de Puebla. He is married to Margarita García, with whom he has four children: Mario, Fernando, Luis and Carlos

Political career
Marín is an active member of the PRI since 1972; he has occupied various positions in the public service in Puebla. He has been professor of law in different Universities in Puebla and has served as judge and notary public in his native state. Marín has also served as municipal president (mayor) of the city of Puebla.

In 2004 he ran for the governorship of Puebla as the PRI candidate; he won the elections held in November 2004 and took office on February 1, 2005. Prior to the controversy that exploded around him in February 2006, he was widely believed to be entertaining presidential ambitions with a view to the 2012 elections. His term ended on January 31, 2011.

Controversy
On February 14, 2006, several telephone conversations between Kamel Nacif Borge and Mario Marín were revealed by the Mexico City daily La Jornada, causing a media frenzy. In these profanity-laden and misogynistic conversations, Nacif and Marín — whom the textile magnate referred to as mi góber precioso, loosely translated as "my gorgeous governor" or "my precious governor", and described as "my hero"  — were exposed discussing jailing journalist Lydia Cacho, after she accused Nacif of pedophilia in her book los Demonios del Éden. Soon after, many sectors of the public took up the call for Marín's resignation, who they too began to call "el precioso Marín" and "mi góber precioso".

In response to the controversy, the Puebla governor went on national television, saying that the voice in the taped conversations was not his, adding that though he knew Kamel Nacif, he considered him a persona non grata. He later confessed that it was his voice and that he had held these conversations with Nacif, but claimed the recordings were used out of context.

On March 13, 2006 Lydia Cacho sued Mario Marín in a federal court for bribery, influence trafficking, conspiracy to rape and abuse of authority.

On January 25, 2007, the justices of the Supreme Court voted unanimously to look into the unusual circumstances surrounding Cacho's arrest by Puebla law enforcement officials in December 2005. Specifically, a three-judge committee will determine if Marín abused his authority by manipulating channels to facilitate Cacho's arrest at the behest of clothing magnate Kamel Nacif. On 29 November 2007 the Supreme Court ruled that Marín had no case to answer in the affair.

On February 3, 2021, Marín was arrested in Acapulco and charged with torturing Cacho. He was transferred to Cancun.

External links
"The Journalist, the King, and the Guv" (El Universal)
"The Puebla case" CityMayors

References

1954 births
Living people
Institutional Revolutionary Party politicians
Municipal presidents in Puebla
Governors of Puebla
Politicians from Puebla
21st-century Mexican politicians
Meritorious Autonomous University of Puebla alumni
Mayors of places in Puebla